Corleone is the first studio album of Lacrim, French rapper of Algerian origin.

Track list
"Corleone" (3:06)
"Mon glock te mettra à genoux" (4:04)
"Oz" (3:31)
"Tout le monde veut des Lovés" (3:10)
"Pronto" (4:29)
"Barbade" (3:28)
"On fait pas ça" (feat. Lil Durk) (4:07)
"La rue" (3:40)
"Pour de vrai" (3:59)
"Bracelet" (3:26)
"Le loup d'la street" (feat. Amel Bent) (2:54)
"A.W.A." (feat. French Montana) (2:43)
"Pocket Coffee" (3:31)
"J'suis qu'un thug" (3:16)
"Mon frère" (4:48)

Charts

Weekly charts

Year-end charts

Certifications

References

2014 albums
French-language albums
Lacrim albums